The Elisha Hopkins House is a historic house in Somerville, Massachusetts.  The 2.5-story wood-frame house was built c. 1868 by Elisha Hopkins, a ship's master.  It has a typical period Italianate plan, with three bays across and small center gable.  The gables have oculi windows characteristic of the style, and there is a later Colonial Revival front porch with turned posts and brackets, and a gable over the entry stair.

The house was listed on the National Register of Historic Places in 1989.

See also
National Register of Historic Places listings in Somerville, Massachusetts

References

Houses on the National Register of Historic Places in Somerville, Massachusetts